Robert "Bob" LeRoy Fitzpatrick (born September 20, 1958) is an American bishop of the Episcopal Church, who is the current Bishop of Hawaii.

Early life and education
He was born on September 20, 1958 in Decatur, Illinois. He received a Bachelor of Arts degree from DePauw University in 1981, a Master of Divinity degree from the General Theological Seminary, and a Doctor of Ministry in Homiletics degree from Seabury-Western Theological Seminary.

Ordained Ministry
After ordination, he became assist priest at St Peter’s Church in Morristown, New Jersey, and in 1990, he became rector (priest-in-charge) of Grace Church in Fort Wayne, Indiana. In 2000, he was called to Hawaii and became a member of the staff of the Bishop of Hawaii, and then as Canon to the Ordinary (the bishop's executive officer)from 2002. He also served as the priest-in-charge of congregations in Kapolei and Honolulu.

Bishop
Fitzpatrick was elected Bishop of Hawaii on October 20, 2006 and was consecrated bishop and installed as ordinary of the diocese on March 10, 2007 by Presiding Bishop Katharine Jefferts Schori, with several international co-consecrators. The bishop is married to Beatrice Elizondo Fitzpatrick. They have two adult sons together.

See also
 List of Episcopal bishops of the United States
 Historical list of the Episcopal bishops of the United States

References

External links
 https://www.episcopalchurch.org/bishop/rt-rev-robert-fitzpatrick
 http://the.honoluluadvertiser.com/article/2006/Oct/20/br/br0615374289.html
 http://www.depauw.edu/news-media/latest-news/details/19064/
 http://archive.episcopalchurch.org/3577_78834_ENG_HTM.htm
 http://archives.starbulletin.com/2007/03/10/features/adamski.html
 http://the.honoluluadvertiser.com/article/2007/Mar/11/ln/FP703110341.html

1958 births
Living people
Episcopal bishops of Hawaii
People from Decatur, Illinois
DePauw University alumni
General Theological Seminary alumni
Seabury-Western Theological Seminary alumni